Burchard II may refer to:

 Burchard II, Duke of Swabia (883/884 – 926)
 Burchard II (Bishop of Halberstadt) (ca. 1028 – 1088)